Tochal Complex consists of many recreational and sports facilities located in Velenjak, north of Tehran.

Tochal Telecabin (gondola lift)

Tochal Telecabin  is one of the world's longest gondola lift lines, with a length of 7500 m. The project started in 1974 by Bahman Batmanghelidj and associates and has been open to the public since 1978. It starts at the Velenjak Valley, north of Tehran, at an altitude of 1900 m, and ends at the last station at an altitude of 3740 m, near the main ridge of Mount Tochal. The gondola lift is used to access ski resorts and other recreational centres on the mountain. The upgraded safety standards of the lines allow families and athletes to enjoy the ride and the other facilities.

tochal also have tennis academy center, that have 2 available courts, 
tochal tennis manager is Mr balochian and tochal tennis head coach is Mr Kiyan Saghti Jalali.

The gondola lift has four stations:

Station 1 is at an elevation of 1900 m and located at the beginning of Velenjak Valley (end of Velenjak Street). Parking, inns and some other facilities are available.

Station 2 is at 2400 m and has very limited facilities.

Station 5 is at 2935 m and has restaurant and a rescue centre. The station is in the middle of one of the ski slopes and is open only in mid-winter and is rarely used. It is also accessible by several climbing paths like Shirpala shelter, Osoon Valley and Palang-chal shelter. To get to Station 7, a transfer is needed here.

Station 7 is at 3740 m and very close to the main ridge of Tochal. It is the last station of the gondola lif and is in the middle of the Tochal ski slope. The Tochal main peak is a 30 m walk away. This station is also reachable from Hezar-cham climbing path from Station 5.

Tochal Ski Resort & Tochal tennis academy

Tochal tennis academy have 2 courts under the supervision of the Head coach Kiyan Saghti Jalali.

The main ski slopes  are located in Station 7:

Peak: This slope starts from the foot of Tochal (at 3850 m) and ends at the hotel (at 3550 m). The slope is 1200 m long and is very suitable. There are a Doppelmayr chairlift and a teleski improvised to transfer skiers. Because of the height of the ski slope in station 7 (more than 3,500 m above sea level), like the Alvares Ski Resort, in Sabalan, Azarbaijan, Iran, the slopes are covered with snow for more than five months a year.

Western Foothill: This slope is on the western foothill of the Tochal Mountain. The length of the ski slope is 900 m, the peak being 3,750 metres m is high and the lowest spot, Tochal Hotel, is 3550 metres high. A Poma chairlift is on this slope for skiers.

Tochal Hotel
The Tochal Hotel is 3550 m above sea level. It is near Mount Tochal and weather-permitting, it takes about an hour to hit the peak.The hotel has near 30 different rooms, a restaurant, entertainment facilities, coffee shop and other facilities.

Pictures

See also
 List of gondola lifts
 List of aerial tramways
 List of ski areas and resorts in Iran

References

External links
 Tochal Telecabin Sports and Recreational Complex
 6 days snow forecast and skiing weather for Tochal

Buildings and structures in Tehran Province
Sport in Iran
Gondola lifts in Iran
Tourist attractions in Tehran Province
Sport in Tehran Province